Malabuyoc, officially the Municipality of Malabuyoc, is a 5th class municipality in the province of Cebu, Philippines. According to the 2020 census, it has a population of 19,770 people.

Malabuyoc is bordered by Alegria in the north, The Tañon Strait in the west, Boljoon in the east, and Ginatilan in the south.

History
According to a popular story, once Malabuyoc grew plenty of fruit trees like mangoes, lanzones, cacaos, and others. So much that the branches of the trees bent down (buyoc in Visaya) under their weight. On account of this, the place came to be called Buyoc.

Malabuyoc is the mother town for Alegria and a contributor town to Ginatilan. Some barangays of both Alegria and Ginatilan were originated from Malabuyoc. Almost half or more than half of the current jurisdictions of Alegria and Ginatilan respectively originally belonged to the jurisdiction of Malabuyoc. If the town of Ginatilan had not been created, Malabuyoc would have been the claimant for the 2nd Filipino Saint: Pedro Calungsod

It was officially established as the original municipality of Alegria and Ginatilan. Though the municipality of Ginatilan is a daughter town of Samboan, Malabuyoc was a contributor to Ginatilan. Malabuyoc separated its parish from Samboan in 1832. Its Parish Church was finished in 1834.

Roman Catholic Parishes for these 3 municipalities in the Roman Catholic Archdiocese of Cebu are,

 San Nicolas De Tolentino Parish (F-1834), Malabuyoc, Cebu 6029
 San Gregorio Magno Parish (F-1847), Ginatilan, Cebu 6028
 Saint Francis Xavier Parish (F-1857), Alegria, Cebu 6030

Geography

Barangays
Malabuyoc comprises 14 barangays:

Climate

Demographics

Economy

The main economy is agriculture in particular fruit-bearing trees. There is a cement plant located within, and a power station planned.

Tourism

Binuyocan Festival
The municipality of Malabuyoc launched the Binuyocan Festival on 10 September 2004, in time for the annual town fiesta. Local contingents paraded the streets. Binuyocan Festival has been part of the fiesta celebration in honor of Saint Nicholas of Tolentino since then.

Tourism
 Handigan Falls (Sorsogon)
 Kanspitan Caves (Sorsogon)
 Da-o Cliff (Sorsogon)
 Balugo Falls (Located at the boundaries of Salmeroz, Mahanlud, Mindanao & Sorsogon)
 Ilihan Hills
 Kabutongan Falls
 Kagula Cliff
 Montañeza Falls & Hot Spring
 Moro Watch Tower
 Old Roman Catholic Church
 Talangnan Marine Sanctuary

Education
Tertiary Schools

 Cebu Technological University (Moalboal-Extension) - Malabuyoc CAMPUS

Secondary Senior High Schools
 Montañeza National High School (MNHS)
 Sorsogon National High School (SNHS)
 Cerdeña  National High School (CNHS)
 Mahanlud  National High School (MNHS)
 Perpetual Soccour Academy (PSA)

Integrated Schools
 Calatagan Integrated School (CIS)
 Looc Integrated School (LIS)

Elementary Schools

 Malabuyoc Central School
 Sorsogon Elementary School
 Mindanao Elementary School
 Salmeron Elementary School
 Santo Niño Elementary School
 Montañeza Elementary School
 Cerdeña Elementary School
 Labrador Elementary School
 Lombo Elementary School
 Armeña Elementary School
 Mahanlud Elementary School
 Calipay Elementary (Mahanlud)
 Palaypay Elementary (Tolosa)

References

External links
 [ Philippine Standard Geographic Code]

Municipalities of Cebu